Donnalee Lozeau was the mayor of Nashua, New Hampshire, from 2007 to 2015. She was Nashua's first female mayor. Prior to becoming mayor she was a New Hampshire State Representative for sixteen years.

Life and career
Mayor Lozeau, a third-generation Nashua native, attended public schools and Rivier College. Notably, she did not graduate. She and her husband of 25 years, David, have three children and two grandchildren. Donnalee began her public service at the age of 24 being elected to the New Hampshire House of Representatives in 1984.  She served 8 terms as a citizen legislator representing Nashua’s Ward 5.  She served as Deputy Speaker to Speaker Donna Sytek. From 1994 to 2008 Mayor Lozeau was Director of Program and Community Development at Southern New Hampshire Services. Donnalee Lozeau currently serves as Executive Director of Southern New Hampshire Services, Inc.

References

1960 births
Living people
Mayors of Nashua, New Hampshire
Members of the New Hampshire House of Representatives
Women mayors of places in New Hampshire
Women state legislators in New Hampshire
21st-century American women